Eribella is a genus of bristle flies in the family Tachinidae.

Species
Eribella exilis (Coquillett, 1897)
Eribella nigrocostalis (Wulp, 1890)
Eribella polita Coquillett, 1902

References

Diptera of North America
Exoristinae
Tachinidae genera